Musaly (also, Musali) is a village in the Salyan Rayon of Azerbaijan.

References 

Populated places in Salyan District (Azerbaijan)